Monica Sagna (born 10 June 1991) is a Senegalese judoka. She is a two-time bronze medalist at the African Games. She has also won numerous medals at the African Judo Championships.

Career 

She won one of the bronze medals in the women's +78 kg event at the 2019 African Games held in Rabat, Morocco.

In 2020, she won one of the bronze medals in the women's +78 kg event at the African Judo Championships held in Antananarivo, Madagascar.

At the 2021 African Judo Championships held in Dakar, Senegal, she also won one of the bronze medals in her event.

Achievements

References

External links 
 

Living people
1991 births
Place of birth missing (living people)
Senegalese female judoka
African Games medalists in judo
African Games bronze medalists for Senegal
Competitors at the 2019 African Games